"Coming Down Again" is a song by the Rolling Stones featured on their 1973 album Goats Head Soup. Keith Richards performs lead vocals.

Credited to Jagger/Richards, "Coming Down Again" is largely the work of Richards, who went as far as to say "'Coming Down Again' is my song" at the time of its release. A slower ballad similar in mood to another track on the album, "Angie", the lyrics tell of Richards' relationship with then-girlfriend Anita Pallenberg, who had chosen to abandon her romantic liaison with his friend and bandmate Brian Jones in favour of one with Richards.

The song opens with Stones recording veteran Nicky Hopkins playing keyboards alongside a fluid, prominent bassline performed by Mick Taylor. Guitars are performed by Richards, who uses the wah-wah pedal for much of the song (an effect used often on Goats Head Soup), as well as Leslie speakers. Charlie Watts performs a "trademark start-stop drum arrangement... that by now had become a familiar device." Bobby Keys performs a saxophone solo near the middle of the song. Jagger performs backing vocals.

Recorded at Dynamic Sounds studio in Kingston, Jamaica, in November and December, 1972, "Coming Down Again" is regarded as one of Richards' best lead vocal performances. Despite some popularity, Richards has never performed the song live on tour with the Rolling Stones.

References

The Rolling Stones songs
1973 songs
Songs written by Jagger–Richards
Songs about drugs
Song recordings produced by Jimmy Miller